Don Owens may refer to:
 Donald Owens (born 1926), American ordained minister in Missouri
 Don Owens (American football) (1932–1997), American football player 
 Donald L. Owens (1930–2012), American military officer and aviator